The 2021–22 Marsh One-Day Cup was the 53rd season of the official List A domestic cricket competition played in Australia. New South Wales were the defending champions.

On 21 July 2021, Cricket Australia confirmed the schedule of the tournament, with the final scheduled to be played on 27 February 2022. On 8 September 2021, Cricket Australia announced that the aforementioned schedule had been scrapped due to ongoing lockdowns in Sydney and Melbourne and subsequent border closures. The fixtures for the first two matches were announced, with the full revised schedule released at a later date.

On 1 October 2021, Cricket Australia confirmed the schedule of two further fixtures, and the postponement of the match between Queensland and Tasmania that was set to occur on 3 October 2021. On 20 October 2021, Cricket Australia confirmed the next set of fixtures, following the border openings in Sydney and Melbourne. On 5 November 2021, Cricket Australia confirmed the schedule for three further fixtures.

After a shortened tournament due to the COVID-19 pandemic, Western Australia and New South Wales had progressed to the final. In the final, Western Australia beat New South Wales by 18 runs to win their 15th one-day title.

Points table

  Qualified to the finals

RESULT POINTS:

 Win – 4
 Tie – 2 each
 No Result – 2 each
 Loss – 0
 Bonus Point – 1 (Run rate 1.25 times that of opposition).

Fixtures
Source:

Final

Television coverage
Every match of the 2021-22 Marsh Cup was streamed live by Cricket Australia through their website and the CA Live app. Kayo Sports also streamed all 19 matches from the tournament. Fox Cricket broadcast 12 matches, including the final.

References

External links
 Series home at ESPN Cricinfo
 Series home at Cricket Australia

Marsh One-Day Cup
Australian domestic limited-overs cricket tournament seasons
Marsh One-Day Cup